Reminisce means to recall a memory, often fondly or nostalgically.

Reminisce and its variants may also refer to:

People
 Reminisce (artist), a San Francisco graffiti artist
 Reminisce (rapper), a Nigerian musician 
 Reminisce Smith (better known as Remy Ma), American rapper

Arts, entertainment, and media

Games
 Reminisce, Volume 2 of the video game .hack//G.U.
 REminiscence, a game engine recreation used in the video game Flashback: The Quest for Identity

Music

 Reminiscience, a 2009 album by Ugress
 Reminisce Cafe, a 2008 album by Gene Summers
 "Reminisce" (song), a 1992 song by R&B artist Mary J. Blige
 "Reminisce", a song on the 2003 single Reminisce / Where the Story Ends by hip-hop band Blazin' Squad

Other arts, entertainment, and media
 Reminisce (magazine), a magazine about the 20th Century 
 Reminiscence, a literary genre
 Reminisce (film), an upcoming American drama film
 Reminiscences (film), a 2011 Peruvian documentary film
 Reminiscent TV Network (R TV), a short-lived British television network catering to Asian programming

See also
 
 Reminiscing (disambiguation)